Kyobo Life Insurance Co., Ltd. is a South Korean life insurance company headquartered in Seoul, South Korea, formerly known as Daehan Kyoyuk Insurance. Kyobo Life is one of the big 3 life insurance companies in South Korea.

The company was founded in 1958 by Shin Yong-ho, and his son Shin Chang-jae has been Chairman and CEO since 2000.

See also
Kyobo Book Center

References

External links
Kyobo Life Homepage (in English)

Jongno District
Insurance companies of South Korea
Financial services companies established in 1958
Companies based in Seoul
South Korean brands
Chaebol
Life insurance companies
Colombia–South Korea relations
South Korean companies established in 1958